Cosmin Constantin Tucaliuc (born 13 May 2000) is a Romanian professional footballer who plays as an attacking midfielder or a winger for Liga I club Petrolul Ploiești, on loan from Farul Constanța.

Club career
Tucaliuc made his professional debut for  Petrolul Ploiești on 25 July 2022, in a 0–2 Liga I loss to UTA Arad.

Honours
Petrolul Ploiești
Liga II: 2021–22

References

External links
 

2000 births
Living people
Sportspeople from Suceava
Romanian footballers
Association football midfielders
Association football wingers
Liga I players
Liga II players
FC Viitorul Constanța players
FCV Farul Constanța players
FC Petrolul Ploiești players
FC Gloria Buzău players
Romania youth international footballers